The urogenital triangle is the anterior part of the perineum.  In female mammals, it contains the vagina and associated parts of the internal genitalia.

Structure
The urogenital triangle is the area bound by a triangle with one vertex at the pubic symphysis and the two other vertices at the iliac tuberosities of the pelvic bone.

Components
As might be expected, the contents of the urogenital triangle differ greatly between the male and the female. Some of the components include:
 Posterior scrotal nerves / Posterior labial nerves
 Urethra
 Vagina
 Bulbourethral gland / Bartholin's gland
 Muscles
 Superficial transverse perineal muscle   
 Ischiocavernosus muscle
 Bulbospongiosus muscle
 Crus penis / Clitoral crura
 Bulb of penis / vestibular bulb
 Urogenital diaphragm
 Muscular perineal body
 Superficial and Deep perineal pouch
 Blood vessels and lymphatics

Additional images

See also
 Anal triangle
 Genitourinary system

References

External links
  - "The Female Perineum: Boundaries of the Female Perineum"
 

Mammal reproductive system